There have been two 20th Divisions in the history of the United States Army.

In early 1917, the 20th Division was established as a National Guard formation consisting of units of the Idaho, Montana, Oregon, Washington, and Wyoming Army National Guards.  On 1 April 1917, the division was activated for federal service as the 41st Division.

In August 1918, fourteen months after the American entry into World War I, another 20th Division was organized. This was a regular army and national army division intended for service in World War I. Since the war ended during their training, the 20th Division did not go overseas. It was demobilized in February 1919 at Camp Sevier, South Carolina. Its composition included the 39th Infantry Brigade (48th and 89th Infantry Regiments) and the 40th Infantry Brigade (50th, 90th Infantry Regiments), plus the 58th Artillery Regiment. (McGrath, The Brigade, p. 167)

See also
20th Armored Division
Divisions of the United States Army

United States Army divisions of World War I
Military units and formations established in 1917
Military units and formations disestablished in 1919
Infantry divisions of the United States Army